The Diocese of Susa or Bishopric of Susa may refer to:

East Syriac Diocese of Susa (3rd–13th centuries), part of Beth Huzaye (East Syriac ecclesiastical province)
Roman Catholic Diocese of Susa (1772– )